Stilson is an unincorporated community in Liberty County, Texas, United States.

Education
Stilson is zoned to schools in the Dayton Independent School District.

References

Unincorporated communities in Liberty County, Texas
Unincorporated communities in Texas